Villagers of Ioannina City (VIC) is a folk rock band from Ioannina, Greece, formed in 2007. They play post, stoner and psychedelic rock with a large dose of Greek folk music from the region of Epirus. The regional musical tradition is characterized by polyphony, specific rhythms and tunes, and the use of clarinet, kaval, and bagpipe. The band fuses this unique folk music with modern psychedelic forms, creating a sound where the dominant solo instrument is the clarinet. They have played in the biggest rock festivals and in numerous sold-out shows in the biggest music scenes in Greece.

Members

Alex (Alex Karametis) – guitar, vocals
Akis (Akis Zois) – bass
Aris (Aris Giannopoulos) – drums
Konstantis (Konstantis Pistiolis) – clarinet, kaval, backing vocals
Kostas (Konstantinos Lazos) – bagpipe, winds
Past members: Giannis Haldoupis, Achilleas Radis

Discography
Promo 2010, April 2010, self-released 
Riza ("root" in Greek), April 2014, Mantra Records
Zvara/Karakolia EP, November 2014, Mantra Records
Age of Aquarius, 2019, Mantra Records

Sources
2020 Album Review – Blabbermouth
2020 Album Review – Metal Temple
Metal Storm
2020 Album Review – Metal Hammer

External links
 Facebook page
 Website

Greek rock music groups
Greek folk rock groups
Greek post-rock groups
Greek alternative rock groups
Greek psychedelic rock music groups
Greek stoner rock musical groups
Musical groups established in 2007